Traian Trestioreanu (June 9, 1919, Ploieşti–August 28, 1972, Doicești) was a Romanian painter, sketcher and muralist.

He studied painting at the Academy of Fine Arts in Bucharest, having among his teachers Camil Ressu.

In 1970, Trestioreanu restored the interior paintings in the monastery of  Coşuna, in Bucovăţ, revealing original frescos from the 16th century.

References

Romanian muralists
People from Ploiești
1919 births
1972 deaths
20th-century Romanian painters